"The class the stars fell on" is an expression used to describe the class of 1915 at the United States Military Academy in West Point, New York. In the United States Army, the insignia reserved for generals is one or more stars. Of the 164 graduates that year, 59 (36%) attained the rank of general, more than any other class in the history of the academy, hence the expression.  Two graduates reached the rank of five-star General of the Army, two were four-star generals, seven three-star lieutenant generals, 24 two-star major generals, and 24 one-star brigadier generals. Dwight D. Eisenhower, one of the five-star generals, went on to become the 34th President of the United States. The other, Omar Bradley, became the first Chairman of the Joint Chiefs of Staff, under Presidents Harry S. Truman and Eisenhower.

The term had previously been applied to the class of 1886, which produced a large number of general officers for World War I. Of this class, which includes John J. Pershing, Charles T. Menoher, and Mason Patrick, 25 out of 77 (32%) became generals.

About the class

Some 287 cadets entered the United States Military Academy at West Point, New York, in 1911, the largest plebe (entering or most junior) class up to that date. That year, the United States Congress changed the rules regarding appointment to the Academy. Previously, Congressmen had been allowed to make one appointment every four years. This was now increased to one every three years. Fourteen more cadets received appointments to the class, which they joined six weeks late, in August 1911, thereby missing out on the infamous period of hazing known as Beast Barracks. They were known as the "Augustines" after the month on which they joined. Among their number was Omar Bradley. Only 164 cadets graduated and were commissioned as second lieutenants on 12 June 1915, but that was still the largest graduating class up to that time, and the US Army had only 105 positions available for them.

The class First Captain (the cadet brigade commander) was Roscoe B. Woodruff. The top 19 graduates all went into the United States Army Corps of Engineers. Ranking first in the class was William E. R. Covell, who edged out Edwin R. Kimble by the narrowest of margins. Covell went on to become a general during World War II. Kimble served during World War I as a major in France, where he died on 9 April 1918 of sepsis after a surgical operation. The youngest graduating member of the class was Clyde R. Eisenschmidt, who was born on 30 July 1894. He retired as a lieutenant colonel on 30 June 1940.

The oldest member of the class was Robert B. Lorch, who was born on 18 December 1888. After serving in France as a major during World War I, he was honorably discharged from the Army on 8 December 1922. Recalled during World War II, he reached the rank of lieutenant colonel in 1950. In a class with many superb athletes, Thomas B. Larkin won the physical fitness contest and was designated "strong man" of the Corps. The lowest ranking member of the class, known as the class "goat", was Charles C. Herrick. After service in France as a major, he was honorably discharged on 15 December 1922, and became an investment banker. Recalled to active duty during World War II, he reached the rank of colonel. Also among the class was Luis R. Esteves, the first Puerto Rican to attend West Point, and the first to graduate. He was the first member of the class to be made a general.

Sixteen members of the class were sons of West Point graduates. Three were both sons and grandsons of graduates. Alexander P. Cronkhite was the son of Major General Adelbert Cronkhite, from the class of 1882, and the grandson of Brigadier General Alexander C. M. Pennington, Jr., of the class of 1860. Ranked 7th in the class, Cronkhite died in a mysterious shooting accident on 25 October 1918. John F. Conklin was the son of Colonel John Conklin of the class of 1884. His maternal grandfather was Major General William H. French of the class of 1837. Oscar Straub was the son of Colonel Oscar I. Straub of the class of 1887, and the grandson of Brigadier General E. Van A. Andruss, from the class of 1864. In addition, John R. Mendenhall's father John Ross Mendenhall had attended the Academy but dropped out in 1881 without graduating, and his grandfather, Colonel John Mendenhall, was a graduate of the class of 1851.  Pearson Menoher was the son of Major General Charles T. Menoher, who was a member of the class of 1886, and served as the first chief of the United States Army Air Service.

Of the others:
 Douglas H. Gillette was the son of Major Cassius E. Gillette from the class of 1884;
 Stafford LeRoy Irwin was the son of Major General George LeRoy Irwin from the class of 1889;
 Sydney Graves was the son of Irwin's classmate William S. Graves;
 Vernon Evans was the son of Lieutenant Colonel William Pierce Evans from the class of 1878;
 John E. Rossell was the son of Colonel William T. Rossell of the class of 1879;
 Donald A. Davison was the son of Lorenzo P. Davison of the class of 1885;
 Henry McE. Pendleton, was the son of Rossell's classmate Colonel Edwin P. Pendleton;
 Blackburn Hall, was the son of William Preble Hall, a Medal of Honor recipient from the class of 1868; and
 Hubert R. Harmon was the son of Colonel Millard F. Harmon Sr. of the class of 1880.
Harmon was preceded by his two older brothers, Kenneth B. Harmon, of the class of 1910, and Millard F. Harmon, Jr., of the class of 1912. Hubert Harmon was ejected when it was discovered that he had two brothers at West Point, as it was felt that the taxpayers would not be getting their money's worth educating three sons of the same family. He was readmitted in June 1911 after his father lobbied numerous government officials. He now only had one brother at West Point, as Kenneth had graduated the year before. Both Millard Jr., and Hubert subsequently became three-star generals.

Due to its origins as an engineering school, the West Point curriculum emphasized mathematics and other technical subjects of relevance to that specialty rather than education in military topics. Much of the military training that was provided concerned close order drill and equitation. Of the top 25 graduates of the class of 1915, 24 were commissioned into the Corps of Engineers. The exception, James A. Lester, who was ranked 23rd, chose to go into the field artillery instead. He would become a major general.

Careers
Of the 164 graduates in the class, 102 (62 percent) served overseas during World War I before the armistice of 11 November 1918, although only 56 (34 percent) saw actual combat. This was not unusual; nearly 60 percent of the Army's regular officers did not serve overseas. A widespread belief that those who had served overseas would receive preferential treatment, including faster promotion, was not borne out by subsequent events. Promotion was by seniority, and glacially slow. Officers commissioned between November 1916 and November 1918 made up 55.4 percent of the Army's officers in 1926. This "hump" constituted a major personnel problem that was solved only by the Army's rapid expansion after 1940 in response to World War II. Much of the success of the class is attributable to being fortunate enough to be just ahead of the hump, but not too old to assume positions of great responsibility during World War II.

Omar Bradley, for example, was promoted to first lieutenant on 1 July 1916, captain on 15 May 1917, and major on 17 June 1918. He had been returned to the grade of captain on 22 January 1920, and promoted to major again on 1 July 1920, only to be returned to captain again on 4 November 1922. He was promoted to major a third time on 25 June 1924, and remained one for twelve years before becoming a lieutenant colonel on 26 June 1936. He was promoted to brigadier general in February 1941.

In the inter-war period, officers led a "country club existence". They had a high social standing, equivalent to that of an upper-middle-class professional. They normally worked a 30-hour week, which gave them plenty of time to spend with their families, and for sports. They and their families had access to free medical and dental care. They had free life insurance, and an adequate salary, which could be stretched because Army commissaries and post exchanges sold many everyday goods tax-free.  They invariably lived on-base in good housing, and in tight-knit and supportive communities. When posted overseas, they took their families with them. A secure and steady job was highly prized during the Great Depression years from 1929 to 1939, and resignations were rare.

There were two levels of advanced schooling. The first was the Command and General Staff School at Fort Leavenworth, which concentrated on teaching officers both command and staff duties related to corps and divisions. Although viewed as competitive, nearly all officers eventually attended. A 1937 survey showed that 97 percent of the Army's colonels and 95 percent of its lieutenant colonels were graduates. There were two senior schools, the Army War College and the Army Industrial College. The Army War College taught the handling of higher formations. The Army Industrial College taught industrial mobilization.

The Army's training program attracted criticism, both at the time and subsequently. In 1937, Brigadier General George C. Marshall felt that in merging instruction on command and staff duties, the Command and General Staff School had neglected the former in favor of the latter, with officers being prepared for staff duties in peacetime rather than the chaos of command in wartime. Brigadier General Lesley J. McNair conducted a survey of graduates in 1939 that found that most felt that there was too much emphasis on obsolete skills like equitation. For this reason, the staff rides were disliked. While most considered the map exercises the most valuable part of the curriculum, some noted that students spent time discovering for themselves things that they could have been told.

Writing in 2011, Jörg Muth concluded that "At Fort Leavenworth, school solutions were always the norm. Ineffective courses were led by instructors who sometimes lacked knowledge of their fields and usually failed in didactics and pedagogics ... It seems in general not to have been a good idea to challenge the instructors at Leavenworth in any way if an officer student wanted to leave the school with a respectable grade." While the education system undoubtedly failed in some key areas, it did create a body of competent division and corps commanders.

The first member of the class to wear a star was Esteves, who was appointed adjutant general of Puerto Rico with the rank of brigadier general in February 1939. During World War II, Eisenhower and Bradley rose to four-star rank. They made decisions that dramatically affected the careers of their classmates. Concerned that Major General Roscoe Woodruff, whose VII Corps was scheduled to spearhead the Normandy landings, had no amphibious experience, Bradley replaced him with Major General J. Lawton Collins. Woodruff returned to the United States. He later distinguished himself in command of the 24th Infantry Division in amphibious operations in the Philippines campaign.

A worse fate befell Major General Henry J. F. Miller, who leaked details of the invasion date at a dinner party in April 1944. He was reduced to his permanent rank of lieutenant colonel and sent home. Eisenhower wrote a letter to him explaining that, "I know of nothing that causes me more real distress than to be faced with the necessity of sitting as a judge in cases involving military offences by officers of character and good record, particularly when they are old and warm friends."  Miller retired due to physical disability on 30 November 1944. In December 1948 he was promoted to brigadier general on the retired list. He died on 7 January 1949.

Apart from those who became generals, the best known member of the class is Louis A. Merrilat, who played college football with the Army Black Knights alongside Bradley and Eisenhower, and was selected as a first-team All-American in both 1913 and 1914. He was wounded in battle while serving in France during World War I, and later played in the National Football League for the Canton Bulldogs in the 1925 NFL season. He became a soldier of fortune, training Iran's Persian Guard, working with the Chinese Army in the 1930s, and serving in the French Foreign Legion. During World War II, he returned to active duty with the US Army, reaching the rank of colonel.

The last surviving general of the class was James Van Fleet, who commanded the 4th Infantry Division, 90th Infantry Division and III Corps during World War II, and the U.S. Eighth Army in the Korean War. Celebrations for his 100th birthday on 19 March 1992 included a parachute drop by the Army's Golden Knights. A West Point Cadet, James Ward, remarked that: "Everything we aspire to be, he's already done. He's the epitome of the Long Gray Line." Van Fleet died on 23 September 1992, at the age of 100.

The last surviving member of the class was Edmund De Treville Ellis. Commissioned in the cavalry, he later transferred to the Quartermaster Corps, with which he served in the European Theater during World War II and during the 1948 Berlin airlift. He retired from the Army as a colonel on 31 March 1950. He became the oldest living graduate of West Point in October 1990, and the last surviving member of the class of 1915 on the death of Van Fleet. He died at the age of 104 on 22 January 1995. Like Van Fleet, he was interred in Arlington National Cemetery.

Generals of West Point Class of 1915

Notes

References

 

United States Military Academy
20th-century military history of the United States
1915 in New York (state)
American military leaders of World War II